Hegedűs or Hegedüs is a Hungarian surname; the surname's alternative form in Slovak is Hegedüš. Notable people with the surname include:

Ádám Hegedűs (born 1989), Hungarian football player
 Adrienn Hegedűs, Hungarian tennis player
Ágnes Hegedűs, Hungarian orienteering competitor
András Hegedüs (1922–1999), Hungarian politician
András Hegedűs (orienteer), Hungarian orienteering competitor
 Csaba Hegedűs (wrestler) (born 1948), Hungarian wrestler 
 Csaba Hegedűs (footballer) (born 1985), Hungarian football player
Csilla Hegedüs (born 1967), Romanian Minister of Culture
Endre Hegedűs (born 1954), Hungarian pianist
Ferenc Hegedüs (born 1959), Hungarian fencer
Gyula Hegedűs (footballer) (born 1980), Hungarian football  player
Ilona Hegedűs, Hungarian writer of science fiction, fantasy and horror poetry
Lajos Hegedűs (born 1987), Hungarian football player
Róbert Hegedűs (born 1973), Hungarian sprint canoeist

See also
Portrait of Kristóf Hegedűs, 1844 painting by Hungarian painter Jozsef Borsos

Hungarian-language surnames